This is an alphabetical list by town of phone dialing codes in Croatia. The country calling code for Croatia is +385. Croatia received a new country code following the breakup of the SFR Yugoslavia (+38) in 1991.

Calling scheme
The international call prefix depends on the country of origin of the call, e.g. 00 for most European countries, and 011 from North America. For domestic calls (within the country), 0 must be dialed before the area code. The prefix for international calls from Croatia is 00 (e.g. for a United States number 00 1 xxx should be dialed).

An example for calling a line in Bjelovar-Bilogora County (area code 043) is as follows:

         xxx xxxx    (within the 043 area)
    0 43 xxx xxxx    (within Croatia)
 +385 43 xxx xxxx    (outside Croatia)

List of area codes
Telephone area codes closely correspond to postal codes in Croatia and are assigned to counties. Both the Zagreb County and the City of Zagreb have the same area code (1), which is further divided into 9 areal subgroups (i.e. from 11 to 19, or 011 to 019 for calls from outside the region).

Mobile phone codes

Since the adoption of mobile number portability, prefixes of existing numbers no longer guarantee that number is in the corresponding mobile network, i.e. carried by the mobile carrier that originally issued the number. Any newly issued number follows the above numbering plan.

Value-added services

Emergency numbers
As mandated by law, all phones detectable by, or temporarily carried by, Croatian carriers provide unlimited access to state emergency numbers free of charge at all times. The Europe-wide 112 emergency number can be used to contact local fire and police departments and emergency medical and search and rescue services.

See also
 Communications in Croatia
 Postal codes in Croatia

References

External links
Area codes in Croatia (map)

Croatia
Telecommunications in Croatia
Telephone numbers